Ombysh is a village in Nizhyn Raion, Chernihiv Oblast (province) of Ukraine. It belongs to Kruty rural hromada, one of the hromadas of Ukraine. 

Ombysh was previously located in the Borzna Raion. The raion was abolished on 18 July 2020 as part of the administrative reform of Ukraine, which reduced the number of raions of Chernihiv Oblast to seven. The area of Borzna Raion was merged into Nizhyn Raion.

References

Notes

Villages in Nizhyn Raion